The 2002 Election Committee subsector by-elections were held on 6 January 2002 to update the membership of the Election Committee for electing the Chief Executive of Hong Kong in the following Chief Executive election in March.

Vacancies
Four vacancies were identified in the following subsectors:
 Architectural, Surveying and Planning Subsector, as Kaizer Lau Ping-cheung, being a Legislative Council member, was deemed to have resigned from the Election Committee on 21 September 2001; 
 Finance Subsector, as Antony Leung Kam-chung resigned from the EC on 28 March 2001 on his appointment as the Financial Secretary of Hong Kong;
 Heung Yee Kuk Subsector, as Tsang Ngan-hoi had died on 25 August 2001; and 
 Legal Subsector, as Audrey Eu Yuet-mee, being a Legislative Council member, was deemed to have resigned from the Election Committee on 21 September 2001.

Results

General outcome
Statistics are generated from the Report on the 2002 Chief Executive Election.

Finance

Architectural, Surveying and Planning

Legal

Heung Yee Kuk

See also
 2002 Hong Kong Chief Executive election

References

2000
2002 elections in China
E
January 2002 events in China